German School Hurghada (DSH) is a German international school in Hurghada, Egypt. The school serves nursery (age 2) until the end of senior high school.

References

External links
 German School Hurghada
 German School Hurghada 

German international schools in Egypt
Schools in Hurghada